Statistics of the Turkish First Football League for the 1965–66 season.

Overview
It was contested by 16 teams, and Beşiktaş J.K. won the championship.

League table

Results

References
Turkey - List of final tables (RSSSF)

Süper Lig seasons
1965–66 in Turkish football
Turkey